Marek Walczewski (9 April 1937 – 26 May 2009) was a Polish actor. He appeared in 55 films and television shows between 1963 and 2004.

Partial filmography

 Passenger (1963) - Tadeusz, husband of Marta
 Ruchome piaski (1969) - Father
 The Third Part of the Night (1971) - Rozenkranc
 The Wedding (1973) - Host
 The Promised Land (1975) - Bum-Bum
 The Story of Sin (1975) - Plaza-Splawski
 Nights and Days (1975) - Daleniecki
 W srodku lata (1976) - Dlugonos
 Death of a President (1977) - Eligiusz Niewiadomski
 Do krwi ostatniej (1978) - Władysław Anders
 The Tin Drum (1979) - Schugger-Leo
 Chcialbym sie zgubic... (1979) - Director Bulwa
 Golem (1980) - Pernat
 Spotkanie na Atlantyku (1980) - Walter
 The War of the Worlds: Next Century (1981) - Committee Receptionist
 Dolina Issy (1982) - Masiulis
 Przeprowadzka (1982)
 Synteza (1984) - Diaz
 O-Bi, O-Ba: The End of Civilization (1985) - Soft's Boss
 Vabank II, czyli riposta (1985) - Twardijewicz
 Ga, Ga - Chwala bohaterom (1986) - Oficer sledczy
 Nikt nie jest winien (1986) - Ryszard
 Cudzoziemka (1986) - Violinist January Badzki
 Kingsajz (1988) - Ala's Father
 Zabij mnie, glino (1988) - Paser
 Co lubia tygrysy (1989) - Sexuologist
 Havet stiger (1990) - Horvat
 Seszele (1991)
 Les enfants du vent (1991)
 A Bachelor's Life Abroad (1992) - Carousel Owner Schumann
 Conversation with a Cupboard Man (1993) - Teatcher
 Pajeczarki (1993) - Painter
 Enak (1993) - State Department
 Dwa ksiezyce (1993) - Mecenas
 El detective y la muerte (1994) - Hombre de Plástico
 Les Milles (1995) - Prof. Pick
 Dzien wielkiej ryby (1997) - Lawyer
 13 posterunek - Sr. Aspirant Stępień
 The Hexer (2001) - Eyck of Denesle
 Ubu król (2003) - General Lascy
 Stranger (2004) - Stefan, father of Ewa

External links

1937 births
2009 deaths
Male actors from Kraków
Polish male film actors
Recipients of the Gold Cross of Merit (Poland)
Recipients of the Gold Medal for Merit to Culture – Gloria Artis